Purovsky District is an administrative and municipal district (raion), one of the seven in Yamalo-Nenets Autonomous Okrug of Tyumen Oblast, Russia. It is located in the center and south of the autonomous okrug. Its administrative center is the town of Tarko-Sale. Population: 51,280 (2010 Census);  The population of Tarko-Sale accounts for 39.8% of the district's total population.

Geography
Purovsky District is named after the Pur river. Lake Pyakuto is located in the district.

References

Notes

Sources

Districts of Yamalo-Nenets Autonomous Okrug